The Old Bunbury railway station was the main railway station for Bunbury from 1894 until 1996. It was the terminus for the Australind passenger railway service from Perth. It was replaced in May 1985 by the current Bunbury Terminal in East Bunbury.

History
The original structure was constructed in the 1880s; the railway was not connected to Perth at that stage. On 14 November 1894, the first station opened as the terminus for the South Western Railway.

A fire in December 1904 destroyed the original wooden station building with a brick replacement opened in 1905. In 1928, the station was rebuilt again.

Bus terminal
Bunbury station was the terminus for bus services from regional locations in the south and south west of Western Australia, to connect with the rail service to Perth. As regional railway passenger services declined, and branch lines were closed, railway bus services were put in place to replace the loss of rail access. The former branch lines to Flinders Bay, Nannup, Manjimup and Pemberton were served by WAGR road buses.

Relocation of railway
The last train to use the station departed on 28 May 1985 with a new station opening at East Bunbury,  to the south-east the following day, along with the railway marshalling yard and other railway facilities. In the early 1990s the re-location was reviewed and confirmed.

Current use

The station building is still used as a bus station which serves as the main terminus for TransBunbury bus services to surrounding suburbs, as well as being the Bunbury Visitor Centre.

Bus Routes
The following public bus routes service the bus station:

‡ This service is free for passengers connecting to or from the Transwa Australind rail service.

See also
 Albany railway station, Western Australia

References

External links

Buildings and structures in Bunbury, Western Australia
Disused railway stations in Western Australia
Railway stations in Australia opened in 1894
Railway stations closed in 1985
State Register of Heritage Places in the City of Bunbury